Anthony Yeboah (born 6 June 1966) is a Ghanaian former professional footballer who played as a striker.

He is considered one of the most prominent and prolific goal scorers in Ghanaian and African football history and gained a reputation for scoring spectacular goals which often featured in Goal of the Month or Goal of the Season competitions, often celebrated by wagging his index finger towards the crowd.

Yeboah is most noted for his time at European clubs 1. FC Saarbrücken, Eintracht Frankfurt, Leeds United and Hamburger SV during the 1990s. He also played for Asante Kotoko, Cornerstones Kumasi, Okwawu United and Al-Ittihad Doha. He was capped 59 times by Ghana, scoring 29 goals. He now runs an international sports agency and a chain of hotels in Ghana. He won the Bundesliga golden boot on two occasions in 1992–93, 1993–94 playing for Eintracht Frankfurt.

Club career
Yeboah was born in Kumasi, Ghana. After spending his youth in Kumasi, Yeboah joined German club 1. FC Saarbrücken in 1988. This move was of some historical significance, because Yeboah became one of the first black players to appear in the Bundesliga. Yeboah had a slow first year, but then scored 17 league goals in his second Saarbrücken year.

Eintracht Frankfurt
He was transferred to Eintracht Frankfurt in 1990, where he was at first booed by a section of fans and—being the first black player the team had ever signed—subjected to monkey-noises and other racist insults. In the Hesse metropolis, Yeboah quickly established himself as a deadly striker, silencing all critics, and became the first African Bundesliga club captain. He was the top Bundesliga scorer twice with Eintracht, in 1993 and 1994.

Leeds United
Yeboah joined English club Leeds United from Eintracht Frankfurt for £3.4 million in January 1995. In his second season at Elland Road he was voted Player of the Year. Yeboah scored a total of 32 goals for Leeds United in 66 appearances, and is still revered as a cult hero for the Yorkshire club due to a series of memorable goals he scored. His volley against Liverpool and his strike versus Wimbledon in the 1995–96 season were among his most notable goals, and he was a regular feature in Goal of the Month in the Premier League. He told Newstalk's Team 33 in 2014 that his favourite goal was the one he scored against Liverpool. The goal against Wimbledon was awarded Goal of the Season in 1995–96. Until Gareth Bale equalled the feat in 2013, Yeboah was the only player ever to win successive BBC Match of the Day Goal of the Month competitions, doing so in September and October 1995.

He also scored three hat-tricks for Leeds; the first against Ipswich Town in the Premier League at Elland Road on 5 April 1995, which made him the third foreign player to score a league hat-trick for Leeds (Cantona v Tottenham in August 1992 was the first, and Phil Masinga three months earlier in an FA Cup tie). Yeboah's second hat-trick came against Monaco in the 1995–96 UEFA Cup on 12 September 1995, and the third 11 days later in the Premier League match against Wimbledon at Selhurst Park which included the aforementioned Goal of the Season.  A video was released named ‘Yeboah – Shoot to Kill’ while he was at Leeds.  Injuries (several picked up while on international duty) restricted his game when he played and kept him out of the Leeds side on several occasions. When George Graham took over as manager, there was a clash of personalities and Yeboah was sold to Hamburger SV in September 1997, having played just six times under Graham.

Later career
Yeboah joined German club Hamburger SV and remained there until 2001, scoring 28 goals. He left in order to join Al Ittihad, where he played under Austrian coach Josef Hickersberger.

International career
He was a member of Ghana's national team for over ten years, and represented his country at three Africa Cup of Nations during the 1990s. Yeboah scored 29 goals in 59 appearances for Ghana, the fourth highest goalscoring total in the nation's history behind Asamoah Gyan, Edward Acquah and Kwasi Owusu.

Post-playing career
On 3 November 2008, he was appointed as the new chairman of the newly promoted Ghana Premier League club Berekum Chelsea.

Personal life
Yeboah along with his cousin former Mainz player Michael Osei runs an international sports agency called Anthony Yeboah Sportpromotion and owns a chain of hotels in Ghana (Accra, Kumasi) called Yegoala. He is married and has two children.

His nephew, Kelvin Yeboah, is also a professional footballer.

Career statistics

Club

International goals
African Cup of Nations only.

Scores and results list Ghana's goal tally first, score column indicates score after each Yeboah goal.

Honours

Asante Kotoko
Ghana Premier League: 1981, 1982, 1983
African Cup of Champions Clubs: 1983

Leeds United
Football League Cup runner-up: 1995–96

Al Ittihad
Qatar Stars League: 2001–02
Emir of Qatar Cup: 2001–02
Qatar Cup runner-up: 2001–02

Ghana
African Cup of Nations runner-up: 1992 
West African Nations Cup – SCSA Zone III: 1982, 1983, 1984

Individual
Ghana Premier League top scorer: 1986, 1987
Bundesliga top scorer: 1992–93, 1993–94
kicker Bundesliga Team of the Season: 1992–93, 1993–94
African Footballer of the Year third: 1992; second: 1993
FIFA World Player of the Year ninth: 1993
Leeds United Player of the Year: 1996
Ghana Footballer of the Year: 1997
Premier League Player of the Month: March 1995, September 1995

References

External links 
 Premier League profile

1966 births
Living people
Association football forwards
Ghanaian footballers
Ghana international footballers
Footballers from Kumasi
1. FC Saarbrücken players
Eintracht Frankfurt players
Leeds United F.C. players
Hamburger SV players
Asante Kotoko S.C. players
Okwawu United players
Al-Gharafa SC players
Bundesliga players
2. Bundesliga players
Premier League players
Qatar Stars League players
Kicker-Torjägerkanone Award winners
Expatriate footballers in Germany
Expatriate footballers in England
Ghanaian expatriate footballers
Ghanaian expatriate sportspeople in Germany
Ghanaian expatriate sportspeople in England
1992 African Cup of Nations players
1996 African Cup of Nations players
1994 African Cup of Nations players
Cornerstones F.C. players
Ghana Premier League top scorers
Expatriate footballers in West Germany